Rudine was a medieval župa (county), which was, according to author Gordana Tomović, located around Rogatica (now in eastern Bosnia and Herzegovina).

According to the same author, it is believed that Vojin held Gacko (1327), while his brother Hrvatin held Rudine, the latter having inflicted damages to the Republic of Ragusa in 1330. It is possible that Hrvatin held Gacko with Rudine, Drina and Dabar. Also, Vuk Kosača (1317–1359), who served Stefan Dušan and distinguished himself in the military, was awarded the spacious province of Rudine.

References

Sources

Župas of the medieval Bosnian state
Rogatica